Pyramids Higher Institute for Engineering and Technology (P.H.I ) is an Egyptian higher institute affiliated to Al-Baraka Association for Social and Educational Services. The institute was established by Ministerial Resolution No. (2591) for the year 2007 in accordance with Law No. 52 for the year 1970.

Study system 
Studying at the institute was in the credit-hour system until 2017, in which the academic year is divided into two main semesters, the first fall semester and the second spring semester, in addition to an optional third summer semester, which is a combination of studying theoretical courses and practicing professional training in an engineering company or office. To obtain a bachelor's degree in this system, a student needs to study a number of courses with at least 172 credit hours, and successfully pass all courses with a GPA of no less than 2.0 (out of a total of 4.0).

After 2017, studying at the Institute became a two-semester system (the traditional system), in which the academic year is divided into two semesters and a summer vacation, and whoever fails one of the courses repeats it in the following academic year, and if the student fails in more than three courses in the same academic year, he must re-study the entire academic year again, regardless of the student's grade in any of the two semester courses (unlike the credit-hour system). In order to obtain a bachelor's degree, the student needs to pass all the compulsory courses, and a certain number of elective courses required by the Institute for graduation after studying for a minimum period of four years in the specialized department, in addition to the first preparatory year, and passing at least two professional trainings in one of the engineering companies and offices.

It is assumed that the regulation of the credit-hour system will be amended and approved again for all upcoming batches of students.

Enrollment

Admissions 
The nomination of students to the institute is made through the Coordination Office for admission unless a decision is issued by the Ministry of Higher Education to the contrary. Non-Egyptian students are accepted through the Expatriates Department. The institute accepts students who have one of the following qualifications:

 The Egyptian General Secondary Certificate (Thanawya 'Amma), the scientific section, Mathematics, and the equivalent of Arab and foreign certificates
 Al-Azhar secondary certificate (Thanawya Azharya)
 Industrial high school diploma, three-year system
 Industrial high school diploma, five-year system
 Industrial Technical Institutes

It is not permissible for a student to register his name in more than one institute at the same time, and it is not permissible to combine enrollment in an institute that is not affiliated with the ministry or any university college, and It is not permissible to re-enroll the student in any institute to obtain a certificate he previously obtained.

Transfer students 
Student enrollment is transferred between the corresponding institutes and colleges according to the following rules:

 A student enrolled in the credit-hour system may be transferred to the two-semester system as long as he does not pass 60% of the total credit hours required for graduation. A set-off is made for the courses that the student has passed in the credit-hour system, and the equivalent courses are determined in the academic program to which he is to be transferred.
 It is not permissible to consider the transfer of students enrolled in the first year between the corresponding institutes unless the student has achieved the minimum score reached by the admission to the institute to which the transfer is required, and it is also required that he be successful in the academic courses (with a maximum of failure in one of the basic subjects) as long as No other instructions from the Ministry of Higher Education have been found
 It is not permissible to accept expelled students
 A student may not be transferred from the credit-hour system to the two-semester system if they do not meet the admission requirements for the two-semester system upon joining the college

In all cases, the review and approval of the competent head of the central administration is required.

Bachelor's degree programs 
The institute has five departments, each of which offers a program of study in a specific engineering discipline. Whoever successfully completes the study program in one of these disciplines will be awarded a bachelor's degree in this engineering discipline, and the Egyptian Minister of Higher Education and Scientific Research will personally equate it with a bachelor's degree in engineering awarded by Egyptian universities that are subject to the Universities Organization Law No. 49 of 1972 and its executive regulations from the engineering faculties in corresponding disciplines.

These programs are:
 Civil Engineering Program
 Architecture Program
 Electrical Power and Control Engineering Program
 Mechatronics Engineering Program
 Electronics and Communications Engineering Program

See also 
 List of universities in Egypt
 Education in Egypt

References

External links 
 
 LinkedIn - Pyramids Higher Institute for Engineering and Technology
 Google Freebase ID

Education in Egypt
2007 establishments in Egypt
Universities in Egypt
Academia in Egypt
Educational institutions established in 2007